The Grammy Award for Best Metal Performance is an award presented at the Grammy Awards to recording artists for works (songs or albums) containing quality performances in the heavy metal music genre. The Grammy Awards is an annual ceremony, where honors in several categories are presented by The Recording Academy of the United States to "honor artistic achievement, technical proficiency and overall excellence in the recording industry, without regard to album sales or chart position". The ceremony was established in 1958 and originally called the Gramophone Awards.

The Recording Academy recognized heavy metal music artists for the first time at the 31st Annual Grammy Awards (1989). The category was originally presented as Best Hard Rock/Metal Performance Vocal or Instrumental, combining two of the most popular music genres of the 1980s. Jethro Tull won that award for the album Crest of a Knave, beating Metallica, which were expected to win with the album ...And Justice for All. This choice led to widespread criticism of The Recording Academy, as journalists suggested that the music of Jethro Tull did not belong in the hard rock or heavy metal genres. In response, The Recording Academy created the categories Best Hard Rock Performance and Best Metal Performance, separating the genres.

The Best Metal Performance category was first presented at the 32nd Annual Grammy Awards in 1990, and was again the subject of controversy when rock musician Chris Cornell (lead vocalist for the band Soundgarden) was perplexed by the academy's nomination of the band Dokken in this category. Metallica won in the first three years. The awards were presented for the song "One", a cover version of Queen's "Stone Cold Crazy", and the album Metallica. During 2012–2013, the award was temporarily discontinued in a major overhaul of Grammy categories; all solo or duo/group performances in the hard rock and metal categories were shifted to the newly formed Best Hard Rock/Metal Performance category. However, in 2014, the Best Hard Rock/Metal Performance category was split, returning the Best Metal Performance category and recognizing quality hard rock performances in the Best Rock Performance category.

The award goes to the artist. The producer, engineer and songwriter can apply for a Winners Certificate.

Metallica holds the record for the most wins in this category, with a total of six. Tool has received the award three times. Black Sabbath, Nine Inch Nails, and Slayer have each received the award twice. The band Ministry holds the record for the most nominations without a win, with six, while the band Megadeth holds the record for most nominations before their first win, winning on their 10th nomination. Poppy is the only female solo artist to be nominated in the category, 30 years after the establishment of the category.

Recipients

 Each year is linked to the article about the Grammy Awards held that year.

See also
 List of Grammy Award categories

References

General
  Note: User must select the "Rock" category as the genre under the search feature.
 

Specific

External links
Official site of the Grammy Awards

 
1990 establishments in the United States
Awards established in 1990
Metal Performance